El Salvador competed at the 1996 Summer Olympics in Atlanta, Georgia, United States, from 19 July to 4 August 1996. This was the nation's sixth appearance at the Olympics.

Comité Olímpico de El Salvador sent a total of 8 athletes to the Games, 6 men and 2 women, to compete in 5 sports. Judoka Juan Vargas was selected to carry his nation's flag during the opening ceremony.

Competitors 
Comité Olímpico de El Salvador selected a team of 8 athletes, 6 men and 2 women, to compete in 5 sports. Judoka Juan Vargas, at age 32, was the oldest athlete of the team, while swimmer Francisco Suriano was the youngest at age 17. 

The following is the list of number of competitors participating in the Games.

Athletics

Men
Track & road events

Women
Track & road events

Cycling

Road
Women

Track
Women

Judo

Men

Swimming

Men

Weightlifting

Men

See also
El Salvador at the 1995 Pan American Games

References
"El Salvador at the 1996 Atlanta Summer Games." Sports-Reference.com. Retrieved on 15 March 2014.
Official Olympic Reports

Nations at the 1996 Summer Olympics
1996
Olympics